Max & Ruby is an animated children's television series based on the book series by Rosemary Wells. In Canada, the series debuted on Treehouse TV on May 3, 2002, and in the United States, the series premiered on Nick Jr. on October 21, 2002, and the series premiered on Noggin on August 16, 2004. A sixth season of the series premiered on September 18, 2016, and concluded on September 24, 2018 in the United States, with a new main voice cast and theme song. A seventh season premiered August 12, 2018 (with the main voice cast reused from Season 6).

Series overview

Episodes

Season 1 (2002–2003)

Season 2 (2003–2004)

Season 3 (2007–2008)

Season 4 (2009–2010)

Season 5 (2011–2013)

Season 6 (2016–2018)
 This is the first season in which Max and Ruby's parents are seen. They were previously mentioned during the first five seasons.
 Episodes go by US broadcast number, and not Canadian broadcast number.
 Max has become interested in Dinosaurs and inspired by many Dinosaur Movies and TV shows, becomes a dinosaur expert.

Season 7 (2018–2019)
In this season, Antônio, Grace and Oliver have now been introduced as the newest characters. Atomic Cartoons now produces this season, as in the previous one the studio was the animation producer.

Notes

References

Lists of Canadian children's animated television series episodes
Lists of Nickelodeon television series episodes